Zone A may refer to:

Fare zones
Fare Zone A, see List of stations in London fare zones 7–9, G and W
Fare Zone A, see Metro Bilbao

Other
Free Territory of Trieste
Morgan Line#Zone A, a region of Italy under Allied military administration 1945-47
Guthrie classification of Bantu languages
Zone A hurricane evacuation zone, see Effects of Hurricane Sandy in New York

See also
Zone-H